The 38th United States Congress was a meeting of the legislative branch of the United States federal government, consisting of the United States Senate and the United States House of Representatives. It met in Washington, D.C. from March 4, 1863, to March 4, 1865, during the last two years of President Abraham Lincoln's first term in office. The apportionment of seats in the House of Representatives was based on the 1860 United States census. The Senate had a Republican majority, and the House of Representatives had a Republican plurality.

Major events

 American Civil War, which had started in 1861, continued through this Congress and ended later in 1865
 January 8, 1863: Ground broken in Sacramento, California, on the construction of the First transcontinental railroad in the United States
 November 19, 1863: Gettysburg Address
 November 8, 1864: President Abraham Lincoln is reelected, defeating George McClellan.

Major legislation

 April 22, 1864: Coinage Act of 1864, Sess. 1, ch. 66, 
 June 30, 1864: Yosemite Valley Grant Act, Sess. 1, 
 March 3, 1865: Freedmen's Bureau, Sess. 2, ch. 90,

Major bills not enacted 
 Wade–Davis Bill passed both houses July 2, 1864 but Pocket vetoed

Constitutional amendments 
 January 31, 1865: Approved an amendment to the United States Constitution abolishing slavery in the United States and involuntary servitude, except as punishment for a crime, and submitted it to the state legislatures for ratification 
 Amendment was later ratified on December 6, 1865, becoming the Thirteenth Amendment to the United States Constitution

Treaties ratified
 February 9, 1865: Chippewa Indians,

States admitted and territories organized

States
June 19, 1863:  West Virginia admitted (formed from a portion of Virginia),  (See also )
October 31, 1864: Nevada admitted,  (See also )

Territories
May 26, 1864: Montana Territory organized, Sess. 1, ch. 95,

States in rebellion

 
The Confederacy fielded armies and sustained the rebellion into a second Congress, but the Union did not accept secession and secessionists were not eligible for Congress. Elections held in Missouri and Kentucky seated all members to the House and Senate for the 38th Congress. Elections held among Unionists in Virginia, Tennessee and Louisiana were marred by disruption resulting in turnouts that were so low compared with 1860, that Congress did not reseat the candidates with a majority of the votes cast. 
 In rebellion 1862–64 according to the Emancipation Proclamation were Arkansas, Texas, Louisiana (parts), Mississippi, Alabama, Florida, Georgia, South Carolina, North Carolina and Virginia (parts). Tennessee was not held to be in rebellion as of the end of 1862.

Party summary
The count below identifies party affiliations at the beginning of the first session of this Congress, and includes members from vacancies and newly admitted states, when they were first seated. Changes resulting from subsequent replacements are shown below in the "Changes in membership" section.

Senate
During this Congress, two seats were added for each of the new states of Nevada and West Virginia, thereby adding four new seats.

House of Representatives

Before this Congress, the 1860 United States Census and resulting reapportionment changed the size of the House to 241 members.  During this Congress, one seat was added for the new state of Nevada, and three seats were reapportioned from Virginia to the new state of West Virginia.

Leadership

Senate
 President: Hannibal Hamlin (R)
 President pro tempore: Solomon Foot (R), until April 13, 1864
 Daniel Clark (R), elected April 26, 1864

Majority (Republican) leadership
 Republican Conference Chairman:  Henry B. Anthony

House of Representatives
 Speaker: Schuyler Colfax (R)

Majority (Republican) leadership
 Republican Conference Chairman:  Justin S. Morrill
 Chairman, Committee on Ways and Means: Thaddeus Stevens (R)

Members
This list is arranged by chamber, then by state. Senators are listed by class, and representatives are listed by district.
Skip to House of Representatives, below

Senate
Senators were elected by the state legislatures every two years, with one-third beginning new six-year terms with each Congress. Preceding the names in the list below are Senate class numbers, which indicate the cycle of their election. In this Congress, Class 1 meant their term began in this Congress, requiring reelection in 1868; Class 2 meant their term ended in this Congress, requiring reelection in 1864; and Class 3 meant their term began in the last Congress, requiring reelection in 1866.

Alabama 
 2. Vacant
 3. Vacant

Arkansas 
 2. Vacant
 3. Vacant

California 
 1. John Conness (R)
 3. James A. McDougall (D)

Connecticut 
 1. James Dixon (R)
 3. La Fayette S. Foster (R)

Delaware 
 1. James A. Bayard Jr. (D), until January 29, 1864
 George R. Riddle (D), from February 2, 1864
 2. Willard Saulsbury Sr. (D)

Florida 
 1. Vacant
 3. Vacant

Georgia 
 2. Vacant
 3. Vacant

Illinois 
 2. William A. Richardson (D)
 3. Lyman Trumbull (R)

Indiana 
 1. Thomas A. Hendricks (D)
 3. Henry S. Lane (R)

Iowa 
 2. James W. Grimes (R)
 3. James Harlan (R)

Kansas 
 2. James H. Lane (R)
 3. Samuel C. Pomeroy (R)

Kentucky 
 2. Lazarus W. Powell (D)
 3. Garrett Davis (U)

Louisiana 
 2. Vacant
 3. Vacant

Maine 
 1. Lot M. Morrill (R)
 2. William P. Fessenden (R), until July 1, 1864
 Nathan A. Farwell (R), from October 27, 1864

Maryland 
 1. Reverdy Johnson (U)
 3. Thomas H. Hicks (UU), until February 14, 1865

Massachusetts 
 1. Charles Sumner (R)
 2. Henry Wilson (R)

Michigan 
 1. Zachariah Chandler (R)
 2. Jacob M. Howard (R)

Minnesota 
 1. Alexander Ramsey (R)
 2. Morton S. Wilkinson (R)

Mississippi 
 1. Vacant
 2. Vacant

Missouri 
 1. John B. Henderson (UU)
 3. Robert Wilson (UU), until November 13, 1863
 B. Gratz Brown (UU), from November 13, 1863

Nevada 
 1. William M. Stewart (R), from February 1, 1865 (newly admitted state)
 3. James W. Nye (R), from February 1, 1865 (newly admitted state)

New Hampshire 
 2. John P. Hale (R)
 3. Daniel Clark (R)

New Jersey 
 1. William Wright (D)
 2. John C. Ten Eyck (R)

New York 
 1. Edwin D. Morgan (R)
 3. Ira Harris (R)

North Carolina 
 2. Vacant
 3. Vacant

Ohio 
 1. Benjamin Wade (R)
 3. John Sherman (R)

Oregon 
 2. Benjamin F. Harding (D)
 3. James W. Nesmith (D)

Pennsylvania 
 1. Charles R. Buckalew (D)
 3. Edgar Cowan (R)

Rhode Island 
 1. William Sprague (R)
 2. Henry B. Anthony (R)

South Carolina 
 2. Vacant
 3. Vacant

Tennessee 
 1. Vacant
 2. Vacant

Texas 
 1. Vacant
 2. Vacant

Vermont 
 1. Solomon Foot (R)
 3. Jacob Collamer (R)

Virginia 
 1. Lemuel J. Bowden (U), died January 2, 1864, vacant thereafter
 2. John S. Carlile (U)

West Virginia 
 1. Peter G. Van Winkle (UU), from August 4, 1863 (newly admitted state)
 2. Waitman T. Willey (UU), from August 4, 1863 (newly admitted state)

Wisconsin 
 1. James R. Doolittle (R)
 3. Timothy O. Howe (R)

House of Representatives

Alabama 
 . Vacant
 . Vacant
 . Vacant
 . Vacant
 . Vacant
 . Vacant

Arkansas 
 . Vacant
 . Vacant
 . Vacant

California 
All representatives were elected statewide on a general ticket.
 . Cornelius Cole (R)
 . William Higby (R)
 . Thomas B. Shannon (R)

Connecticut 
 . Henry C. Deming (R)
 . James E. English (D)
 . Augustus Brandegee (R)
 . John H. Hubbard (R)

Delaware 
 . William Temple (D), until May 28, 1863
 Nathaniel B. Smithers (UU), from December 7, 1863

Florida 
 . Vacant

Georgia 
 . Vacant
 . Vacant
 . Vacant
 . Vacant
 . Vacant
 . Vacant
 . Vacant

Illinois 
 . Isaac N. Arnold (R)
 . John F. Farnsworth (R)
 . Elihu B. Washburne (R)
 . Charles M. Harris (D)
 . Owen Lovejoy (R), until March 25, 1864
 Ebon C. Ingersoll (R), from May 20, 1864
 . Jesse O. Norton (R)
 . John R. Eden (D)
 . John T. Stuart (D)
 . Lewis W. Ross (D)
 . Anthony L. Knapp (D)
 . James C. Robinson (D)
 . William R. Morrison (D)
 . William J. Allen (D)
 . James C. Allen (D)

Indiana 
 . John Law (D)
 . James A. Cravens (D)
 . Henry W. Harrington (D)
 . William S. Holman (D)
 . George W. Julian (R)
 . Ebenezer Dumont (R)
 . Daniel W. Voorhees (D)
 . Godlove S. Orth (R)
 . Schuyler Colfax (R)
 . Joseph K. Edgerton (D)
 . James F. McDowell (D)

Iowa 
 . James F. Wilson (R)
 . Hiram Price (R)
 . William B. Allison (R)
 . Josiah B. Grinnell (R)
 . John A. Kasson (R)
 . Asahel W. Hubbard (R)

Kansas 
 . A. Carter Wilder (R)

Kentucky 
 . Lucien Anderson (UU)
 . George H. Yeaman (U)
 . Henry Grider (U)
 . Aaron Harding (U)
 . Robert Mallory (U)
 . Green C. Smith (UU)
 . Brutus J. Clay (U)
 . William H. Randall (UU)
 . William H. Wadsworth (U)

Louisiana 
 . Vacant
 . Vacant
 . Vacant
 . Vacant
 . Vacant

Maine 
 . Lorenzo D.M. Sweat (D)
 . Sidney Perham (R)
 . James G. Blaine (R)
 . John H. Rice (R)
 . Frederick A. Pike (R)

Maryland 
 . John A. J. Creswell (UU)
 . Edwin H. Webster (UU)
 . Henry Winter Davis (UU)
 . Francis Thomas (UU)
 . Benjamin G. Harris (D)

Massachusetts 
 . Thomas D. Eliot (R)
 . Oakes Ames (R)
 . Alexander H. Rice (R)
 . Samuel Hooper (R)
 . John B. Alley (R)
 . Daniel W. Gooch (R)
 . George S. Boutwell (R)
 . John D. Baldwin (R)
 . William B. Washburn (R)
 . Henry L. Dawes (R)

Michigan 
 . Fernando C. Beaman (R)
 . Charles Upson (R)
 . John W. Longyear (R)
 . Francis W. Kellogg (R)
 . Augustus C. Baldwin (D)
 . John F. Driggs (R)

Minnesota 
 . William Windom (R)
 . Ignatius L. Donnelly (R)

Mississippi 
 . Vacant
 . Vacant
 . Vacant
 . Vacant
 . Vacant

Missouri 
 . Francis P. Blair Jr. (R), until June 10, 1864
 Samuel Knox (UU), from June 10, 1864
 . Henry T. Blow (UU)
 . John W. Noell (UU), until March 14, 1863
 John G. Scott (D), from December 7, 1863
 . Sempronius H. Boyd (UU)
 . Joseph W. McClurg (UU)
 . Austin A. King (U)
 . Benjamin F. Loan (UU)
 . William A. Hall (U)
 . James S. Rollins (U)

Nevada 
 . Henry G. Worthington (R), from October 31, 1864 (newly admitted state)

New Hampshire 
 . Daniel Marcy (D)
 . Edward H. Rollins (R)
 . James W. Patterson (R)

New Jersey 
 . John F. Starr (R)
 . George Middleton (D)
 . William G. Steele (D)
 . Andrew J. Rogers (D)
 . Nehemiah Perry (D)

New York 
 . Henry G. Stebbins (D), until October 24, 1864
 Dwight Townsend (D), from December 5, 1864
 . Martin Kalbfleisch (D)
 . Moses F. Odell (D)
 . Benjamin Wood (D)
 . Fernando Wood (D)
 . Elijah Ward (D)
 . John W. Chanler (D)
 . James Brooks (D)
 . Anson Herrick (D)
 . William Radford (D)
 . Charles H. Winfield (D)
 . Homer A. Nelson (D)
 . John B. Steele (D)
 . Erastus Corning (D), until October 5, 1863
 John V. L. Pruyn (D), from December 7, 1863
 . John Augustus Griswold (D)
 . Orlando Kellogg (R)
 . Calvin T. Hulburd (R)
 . James M. Marvin (R)
 . Samuel F. Miller (R)
 . Ambrose W. Clark (R)
 . Francis Kernan (D)
 . DeWitt C. Littlejohn (R)
 . Thomas T. Davis (R)
 . Theodore M. Pomeroy (R)
 . Daniel Morris (R)
 . Giles W. Hotchkiss (R)
 . Robert B. Van Valkenburgh (R)
 . Freeman Clarke (R)
 . Augustus Frank (R)
 . John Ganson (D)
 . Reuben E. Fenton (R), until December 20, 1864

North Carolina 
 . Vacant
 . Vacant
 . Vacant
 . Vacant
 . Vacant
 . Vacant
 . Vacant

Ohio 
 . George H. Pendleton (D)
 . Alexander Long (D)
 . Robert C. Schenck (R) 
 . John F. McKinney (D)
 . Francis C. Le Blond (D)
 . Chilton A. White (D)
 . Samuel S. Cox (D)
 . William Johnston (D)
 . Warren P. Noble (D)
 . James M. Ashley (R)
 . Wells A. Hutchins (D)
 . William E. Finck (D)
 . John O'Neill (D)
 . George Bliss (D)
 . James R. Morris (D)
 . Joseph W. White (D)
 . Ephraim R. Eckley (R)
 . Rufus P. Spalding (R)
 . James A. Garfield (R)

Oregon 
 . John R. McBride (R)

Pennsylvania 
 . Samuel J. Randall (D)
 . Charles O'Neill (R)
 . Leonard Myers (R)
 . William D. Kelley (R)
 . M. Russell Thayer (R)
 . John D. Stiles (D)
 . John M. Broomall (R)
 . Sydenham E. Ancona (D)
 . Thaddeus Stevens (R)
 . Myer Strouse (D)
 . Philip Johnson (D)
 . Charles Denison (D)
 . Henry W. Tracy (IR)
 . William H. Miller (D)
 . Joseph Bailey (D)
 . Alexander H. Coffroth (D)
 . Archibald McAllister (D)
 . James T. Hale (IR)
 . Glenni W. Scofield (R)
 . Amos Myers (R)
 . John L. Dawson (D)
 . James K. Moorhead (R)
 . Thomas Williams (R)
 . Jesse Lazear (D)

Rhode Island 
 . Thomas A. Jenckes (R)
 . Nathan F. Dixon Jr. (R)

South Carolina 
 . Vacant
 . Vacant
 . Vacant
 . Vacant

Tennessee 
 . Vacant
 . Vacant
 . Vacant
 . Vacant
 . Vacant
 . Vacant
 . Vacant
 . Vacant

Texas 
 . Vacant
 . Vacant
 . Vacant
 . Vacant

Vermont 
 . Frederick E. Woodbridge (R)
 . Justin S. Morrill (R)
 . Portus Baxter (R)

Virginia 
 . Vacant
 . Vacant
 . Vacant
 . Vacant
 . Vacant
 . Vacant
 . Vacant
 . Vacant
 . Vacant, moved to West Virginia June 20, 1863
 . Vacant, moved to West Virginia June 20, 1863
 . Vacant, moved to West Virginia June 20, 1863

West Virginia 
 . Jacob B. Blair (UU), from December 7, 1863 (newly admitted state)
 . William G. Brown Sr. (UU), from December 7, 1863 (newly admitted state)
 . Kellian Whaley (UU), from December 7, 1863 (newly admitted state)

Wisconsin 
 . James S. Brown (D)
 . Ithamar C. Sloan (R)
 . Amasa Cobb (R)
 . Charles A. Eldredge (D)
 . Ezra Wheeler (D)
 . Walter D. McIndoe (R)

Non-voting members 
 . Charles D. Poston (R), from December 5, 1864
 . Hiram P. Bennet (R)
 . William Jayne (R), until June 17, 1864
 John B. S. Todd (D), from June 17, 1864
 . William H. Wallace (R), from February 1, 1864
 . Samuel McLean (D), from January 6, 1865
 . Samuel G. Daily (R)
 . Gordon N. Mott (R), until October 31, 1864
 . Francisco Perea (R)
 . John F. Kinney (D)
 . George E. Cole (D)

Changes in membership
The count below reflects changes from the beginning of the first session of this Congress.

Senate 
 Replacements: 2
 Democratic: no net change
 Republican: no net change
 Unionist: no net change
 Unconditional Union: no net change
 Deaths: 1
 Resignations: 2
 Interim appointments: 1
 Seats of newly admitted states: 4
Total seats with changes: 4

|-
| West Virginia (1)
| New seat
| West Virginia admitted to the Union June 19, 1863.Its first Senators were elected August 4, 1863.
| nowrap  | Peter G. Van Winkle (UU)
| August 4, 1863

|-
| West Virginia (2)
| New seat
| West Virginia admitted to the Union June 19, 1863.Its first Senators were elected August 4, 1863.
| nowrap  | Waitman T. Willey (UU)
| August 4, 1863

|-
| Missouri (3)
| nowrap  | Robert Wilson (UU)
| Successor elected for Sen. Waldo P. Johnson November 13, 1863.
| nowrap  | B. Gratz Brown (UU)
| November 13, 1863

|-
| Virginia (1)
| nowrap  | Lemuel J. Bowden (U)
| Died January 2, 1864.
| Vacant
| Not filled this Congress

|-
| Delaware (1)
| nowrap  | James A. Bayard Jr. (D)
| Resigned January 29, 1864, for unknown reasons.Successor elected January 29, 1864.
| nowrap  | George R. Riddle (D)
| February 2, 1864

|-
| Maine (2)
| nowrap  | William P. Fessenden (R)
| Resigned July 1, 1864, to become U.S. Secretary of the Treasury.Successor appointed October 27, 1864, to finish the term.
| nowrap  | Nathan A. Farwell (R)
| October 27, 1864

|-
| Nevada (1)
| New seat
| Nevada admitted to the Union October 31, 1864.Its first Senators were elected February 1, 1865.
| nowrap  | William M. Stewart (R)
| February 1, 1865

|-
| Nevada (3)
| New seat
| Nevada admitted to the Union October 31, 1864.Its first Senators were elected February 1, 1865.
| nowrap  | James W. Nye (R)
| February 1, 1865

|-
| Maryland (3)
| nowrap  | Thomas H. Hicks (UU)
| Died February 14, 1865.
| Vacant
| Not filled this Congress.

|}

House of Representatives 
 Replacements: 6
 Democratic: no net change
 Republican: no net change
 Unionist: no net change
 Unconditional Union: no net change
 Deaths: 3
 Resignations: 3
 Contested election: 1
 Seats of newly admitted seats: 4
Total seats with changes: 7

|-
| 
| Vacant
| Territory organized in previous congress.Seat remained vacant until December 5, 1864.
| nowrap  | Charles D. Poston (R)
| December 5, 1864

|-
| 
| nowrap  | John W. Noell (UU)
| Died March 14, 1863.
| nowrap  | John G. Scott (D)
| December 7, 1863

|-
| 
| nowrap  | William Temple (D)
| Died May 28, 1863.
| nowrap  | Nathaniel B. Smithers (UU)
| December 7, 1863

|-
| 
| nowrap  | Erastus Corning (D)
| Resigned October 5, 1863.
| nowrap  | John V. L. Pruyn (D)
| December 7, 1863

|-
| 
| New State
| West Virginia admitted to the Union June 19, 1863.Seat remained vacant until December 7, 1863.
| nowrap  | Jacob B. Blair (UU)
| December 7, 1863

|-
| 
| New State
| West Virginia admitted to the Union June 19, 1863.Seat remained vacant until December 7, 1863.
| nowrap  | William G. Brown Sr. (UU)
| December 7, 1863

|-
| 
| New State
| West Virginia admitted to the Union June 19, 1863.Seat remained vacant until December 7, 1863.
| nowrap  | Kellian Whaley (UU)
| December 7, 1863

|-
| 
| New Territory
| Territory organized February 1, 1864.
| nowrap  | William H. Wallace (R)
| February 1, 1864

|-
| 
| nowrap  | Owen Lovejoy (R)
| Died March 25, 1864.
| nowrap  | Ebon C. Ingersoll (R)
| May 20, 1864

|-
| 
| New Territory
| Territory organized May 26, 1864.Seat remained vacant until January 6, 1865.
| nowrap  | Samuel McLean (D)
| January 6, 1865

|-
| 
| nowrap  | Francis P. Blair Jr. (R)
| Lost contested election June 10, 1864
| nowrap  | Samuel Knox (UU)
| June 10, 1864

|-
| 
| nowrap | William Jayne
| Lost contested election June 17, 1864
| nowrap  | John B. S. Todd (D)
| June 17, 1864

|-
| 
| nowrap  | Henry G. Stebbins (D)
| Resigned October 24, 1864.
| nowrap  | Dwight Townsend (D)
| December 5, 1864

|-
| 
| nowrap  | Gordon N. Mott (R)
| Nevada achieved statehood October 31, 1864
| colspan=2 | District eliminated

|-
| 
| New State
| Nevada admitted to the Union October 31, 1864.
| nowrap  | Henry G. Worthington (R)
| October 31, 1864

|-
| 
| nowrap  | Reuben Fenton (R)
| Resigned December 20, 1864, after being elected Governor of New York.
| Vacant
| Not filled this Congress

|}

Committees

Senate

 Agriculture (John Sherman, Chair)
 Audit and Control the Contingent Expenses of the Senate (James Dixon, Chair)
 Claims (Daniel Clark, Chair)
 Commerce (Zachariah Chandler, Chair)
 Distributing Public Revenue Among the States (Select)
 District of Columbia (James W. Grimes, Chair)
 Engrossed Bills (Henry S. Lane, Chair)
 Finance (William P. Fessenden, Chair)
 Foreign Relations (Charles Sumner, Chair) 
 Indian Affairs (James Rood Doolittle, Chair)
 Judiciary (Lyman Trumbull, Chair) 
 Manufactures (Zachariah Chandler, Chair)
 Military Affairs (Henry Wilson, Chair)
 Naval Affairs (John P. Hale, Chair)
 Naval Supplies (Select)
 Ordnance and War Ships (Select)
 Overland Mail Service (Select)
 Pacific Railroad (Select) (Jacob M. Howard, Chair)
 Patents and the Patent Office (Edgar Cowan, Chair)
 Pensions (La Fayette S. Foster, Chair)
 Post Office and Post Roads (Jacob Collamer, Chair)
 Private Land Claims (Ira Harris, Chair)
 Public Buildings and Grounds (Solomon Foot, Chair)
 Public Lands (James Harlan, Chair)
 Retrenchment (N/A, Chair)
 Revolutionary Claims (Morton S. Wilkinson, Chair)
 Slavery and the Treatment of Freedmen (Select)
 Tariff Regulation (Select)
 Territories (Benjamin F. Wade, Chair)
 Whole

House of Representatives

 Accounts (Edward H. Rollins, Chair)
 Agriculture (Brutus J. Clay, Chair)
 Banking and Currency (N/A, Chair) 
 Bankrupt Law (Select)
 Claims (James T. Hale, Chair)
 Commerce (Elihu B. Washburne, Chair)
 District of Columbia (Owen Lovejoy, Chair)
 Elections (Henry L. Dawes, Chair) 
 Expenditures in the Interior Department (Thomas B. Shannon, Chair)
 Expenditures in the Navy Department (Portus Baxter, Chair)
 Expenditures in the Post Office Department (Theodore M. Pomeroy, Chair)
 Expenditures in the State Department (Frederick A. Pike, Chair)
 Expenditures in the Treasury Department (Amos Myers, Chair)
 Expenditures in the War Department (Henry C. Deming, Chair)
 Expenditures on Public Buildings (John W. Longyear, Chair)
 Foreign Affairs (Henry Winter Davis, Chair)
 Indian Affairs (William Windom, Chair) 
 Invalid Pensions (Kellian V. Whaley, Chair)
 Judiciary (James F. Wilson, Chair) 
 Manufactures (James K. Moorhead, Chair)
 Mileage (James C. Robinson, Chair)
 Military Affairs (Robert C. Schenck, Chair) 
 Militia (Robert B. Van Valkenburgh, Chair)
 Naval Affairs (Alexander H. Rice, Chair)
 Patents (Thomas A. Jenckes, Chair)
 Post Office and Post Roads (John B. Alley, Chair)
 Private Land Claims (M. Russell Thayer, Chair)
 Public Buildings and Grounds (John H. Rice, Chair) 
 Public Expenditures (Calvin T. Hulburd, Chair)
 Public Lands (George W. Julian, Chair)
 Revisal and Unfinished Business (Sempronius H. Boyd, Chair)
 Revolutionary Claims (Hiram Price, Chair)
 Revolutionary Pensions (Dewitt C. Littlejohn, Chair)
 Roads and Canals (Isaac N. Arnold, Chair)
 Rules (Select)
 Standards of Official Conduct
 Territories (James M. Ashley, Chair)
 Ways and Means (Thaddeus Stevens, Chair)
 Whole

Joint appointments

 Conditions of Indian Tribes (Special)
 Conduct of the War
 Enrolled Bills (Sen. Timothy Howe, Chair)
 The Library (Sen. Jacob Collamer, Chair)
 Printing (Sen. Henry B. Anthony, Chair)
 Senate Chamber and the Hall of the House of the Representatives

Caucuses 
 Democratic (House)
 Democratic (Senate)

Employees

Legislative branch agency directors
 Architect of the Capitol: Thomas U. Walter
 Librarian of Congress: John Gould Stephenson, until 1864 
 Ainsworth Rand Spofford, from 1864

Senate
 Chaplain: Byron Sunderland (Presbyterian), until May 11, 1864
 Thomas Bowman (Methodist), elected May 11, 1864
 Secretary: John W. Forney
 Sergeant at Arms: George T. Brown

House of Representatives
 Chaplain: William H. Channing (Unitarian)
 Clerk: Emerson Etheridge, until December 7, 1863
 Edward McPherson, from December 7, 1863
 Doorkeeper: Ira Goodnow
 Messenger: Thaddeus Morrice
 William D. Todd
 Postmaster: William S. King
 Reading Clerks: 
 Sergeant at Arms: Edward Ball, until December 7, 1863
 Nehemiah G. Ordway, from December 7, 1863

See also 
 1862 United States elections (elections leading to this Congress)
 1862–63 United States Senate elections
 1862–63 United States House of Representatives elections
 1864 United States elections (elections during this Congress, leading to the next Congress)
 1864 United States presidential election
 1864–65 United States Senate elections
 1864–65 United States House of Representatives elections

Notes

References

External links
 Statutes at Large, 1789–1875
 Senate Journal, First Forty-three Sessions of Congress
 House Journal, First Forty-three Sessions of Congress
 Biographical Directory of the U.S. Congress
 U.S. House of Representatives: House History
 U.S. Senate: Statistics and Lists
 
 

 
1863 establishments in the United States